Violet Cornelia Elizabeth Wattenberg (born 5 December 1978) is an Indian-born Dutch former cricketer who played as a right-handed batter and wicket-keeper. She appeared in one Test match, 19 One Day Internationals and 11 Twenty20 Internationals for the Netherlands between 2007 and 2011. In the Netherlands' only Test match, she was the team's highest-scorer, including scoring 49 in the first innings. She also spent one season playing for Warwickshire in 2008.

References

External links
 
 

1978 births
Living people
Cricketers from Goa
Sportswomen from Goa
Indian emigrants to the Netherlands
Netherlands women Test cricketers
Netherlands women One Day International cricketers
Netherlands women Twenty20 International cricketers
Warwickshire women cricketers
Wicket-keepers